Im Jae-Sun (born June 10, 1968) is a South Korean footballer. He was Top Scorer in 1994 Korean League Cup

References

External links
 

1968 births
Living people
South Korean footballers
FC Seoul players
Ulsan Hyundai FC players
Jeonnam Dragons players
Seongnam FC players
K League 1 players
Association football forwards